was a junior college in Sakai, Osaka Prefecture, Japan, and is part of the Hagoromo Gakuen network.

The institute was founded in 1923, and developed as a Junior College in 1964; in 2006, the Junior College was closed.

Educational institutions established in 1964
Japanese junior colleges
1964 establishments in Japan